"The French Mistake" is the fifteenth episode of the sixth season of paranormal drama television series Supernatural. It was first broadcast on The CW on February 25, 2011. In this episode, Sam and Dean are sent to an alternate reality by the angel Balthazar, where they are called actors named "Jared Padalecki" and "Jensen Ackles" who play Sam and Dean in a television show that follows their lives named Supernatural. Furthermore, in this reality, nothing supernatural exists. Sam and Dean attempt to return to their reality, but are hampered by their lives as actors as well as the crew of their TV show.

Plot
Sam (Jared Padalecki) and Dean Winchester (Jensen Ackles) are doing research at the house of Bobby Singer (Jim Beaver) when the rogue angel Balthazar (Sebastian Roché) appears. He says that the archangel Raphael is aiming to kill all the allies of the angel Castiel (Misha Collins), and so he gives them a key and sends them to an alternate reality to keep them out of harm's way. According to Balthazar, the key opens a door where he has stored stolen angelic weapons, which will help Castiel gain control in Heaven.

When they appear in the alternate reality, Sam and Dean find themselves on the set of Supernaturala fantasy horror television series that is being filmed in Vancouver, Canada. In this dimension, Sam and Dean are actors known as "Jared Padalecki" and "Jensen Ackles", and they star in the aforementioned show, which follows the adventures of the fictitious Winchester brothers. In order to figure out what is going on, they try to contact Castiel, but instead encounter "Misha Collins", an actor who simply plays Castiel on the show. Eventually, Dean suggests they try doing the same spell Balthazar did in order to get them back to their own reality.

Discouraged that the ingredients for Balthazar's spell cannot be located on the set of Bobby's house, Sam and Dean have the actors' driver, Clif Kosterman (Phil Hayes), take them to Jared's place, which turns out to be a large ostentatious mansion. Sam and Dean are shocked when Rubyor rather, "Genevieve Padalecki" the actress who plays herappears and kisses Sam; eventually, Sam and Dean realize that in this dimension, she is Jared's wife. After Genevieve heads out to a charity function for the International Otter Adoption Fund, Sam and Dean go online and purchase bonafide saints' bones for rush delivery using Jared's credit cards. Dean then spends the night on Jared's couch, while Sam alternates between surfing the internet for signs of supernatural activity and having sex with Genevieve.

The next morning, Clif drives them to the airport to pick up the rush delivery before taking them back to the set. Before they are able to work the spell, however, the show's director Bob Singer (portrayed in the episode by Brian Doyle-Murray) forces them to act in a scene, which ends badly after many takes. Eventually, they are able to try the spell, but nothing happens. This causes them to the conclusion that in this reality there is no real magic and that the supernatural simply does not exist.

Back on set, Raphael's angelic hitman Virgil (Carlos Sanz) appears from the Winchester's reality and tries to vanquish Dean with his angel powers. However, he, too, is devoid of powers in this reality, so Sam and Dean are able to physically attack and subdue him. In time, the rest of the crew intervenes, however, and during the resulting scuffle Virgil pickpockets the key Balthazar gave Sam before running away. After this incident, the crew of Supernatural is suspicious because "Jared" and "Jensen" are behaving extremely out of character: Normally they do not speak to each other, they came in with a mysterious package (which, in reality, is holding the saint's bones) which the crew believes are either drugs or black market organs, and now they have beaten up what everyone thinks is an extra. Bob Singer calls showrunner Sera Gamble and suggests that they get Eric Kripke (portrayed in the episode by Micah A. Hauptman) to come to Vancouver and talk to the actors, to which Sera reluctantly agrees. Meanwhile, Virgil takes Misha hostage and kills him so he can use his blood to contact Raphael.

Bob confronts Sam and Dean, and they drop the pretense of being Jared and Jensen and tell him that they quit the show. They then go back to Jared's house and learn from Genevieve that Misha was killed.  They go to the scene of the crime to investigate, and learn from a witness states that the killer was speaking to a "Raphael". They also learn from the relayed conversation that Virgil will return to the set of Supernatural, where he will be pulled back into the Winchester's reality by Raphael himself. Eventually, Virgil returns on set just as Kripke arrives to speak to them, and the angel goes on a killing spree, murdering Eric Kripke, Bob Singer, and many other crew members before Sam and Dean manage to knock him out and retrieve the stolen key. Just as Sam has the key in hand, Raphael activates the nearby gate between the worlds, and they land back in their own reality.

Back in their original reality, Sam and Dean come face-to-face with Raphael (Lanette Ware). He demands that they turn over the key and begins to torture the brothers when they refuse. Just then, Balthazar arrives and reveals that the key which Sam and Dean had the entire time was a fake and that the sojourn through the alternate reality was a diversion to throw off Raphael and his minions. Angered that he has been tricked, Raphael threatens to kill them all, but Castiel arrives on the scene; he orders Raphael to let his friends go and also reveals to the archangel that he is now in possession of Heaven's weapons. Raphael, out-maneuvered and out-gunned flees, and Castiel returns Sam and Dean back to Bobby's house. Sam and Dean demand to know what exactly is going on, to which Castiel makes a vague promise that he will tell them in time what is happening in Heaven.

Production 
The title of "The French Mistake" is a reference to the climax of the 1974 American satirical western film Blazing Saddles: At the end of said movie, a fight between the heroes and villains breaks out that literally breaks the fourth wall and spills over into an adjacent movie set wherein a musical entitled The French Mistake is being filmed.

Reception
"The French Mistake" aired on The CW on February 25, 2011. The episode was watched by 2.18 million viewers with a 1.0/4 share among adults aged 18 to 49. This means that 1.0 percent of all households with televisions watched the episode, while 3 percent of all households watching television at that time watched it. Supernatural ranked as the second most-watched program on The CW in the day, behind Smallville.

Zack Handlen of The A. V. Club'' gave "The French Mistake" an A, calling it "Supernatural at its most gloriously self-referential". While noting that the episode was not perfect, Handlen nevertheless found the entry to be humorous and "smart" in a way that prevented him from "really want[ing] to poke holes in it".

Diana Steenbergen of IGN gave "The French Mistake" a 9.5 score out of 10 and applauded the show writers for taking "an insane idea and turn it into gold". In particular, Steenbergen cited the episode's willingness to playfully lampoon the shows stars and producers as one of its strongest elements.

The episode has become a large point of discussion among the show's fans, as well as the cast and crew, due to its in-jokes and meta plot. In particular, creator Eric Kripke and actor Jared Padalecki have cited "The French Mistake" as one of their all time favorite episodes of the show.

References

Bibliography

External links
 

Supernatural (season 6) episodes
2011 American television episodes
Television episodes set in California